Sauravus is an extinct genus of nectridean lepospondyl within the family Scincosauridae.

Species

The type species of Sauravus, Sauravus costei, is known from Blanzy, a town in the Saône-et-Loire department of France. This town and its adjacent community Montceau-les-Mines possess containing abundant Carboniferous fossils. These fossils are believed to have been from the Stephanian B stage of the Late Carboniferous, approximately 305 to 304 million years ago.

Sauravus cambrayi is known from Les Télots, a mine near Autun, Saône-et-Loire, France. Télots is the type locality of the Autunian stage, a period of time which is believed to correspond to part of the early Permian period. The geological formation which Télots fossils belong to is known as the Millery Formation. The specific part of the Permian which this formation belongs to was unclear for many years. In 2014, Schneider et al. suggested that the Millery Formation dated to the middle Artinskian age, about 290 to 286 million years ago.

Sauravus spinosus is a rename of Scincosaurus spinosus, a Montceau-les-Mines scincosaurid described by C. Civet in 1982. Although that author considered the species to belong to Scincosaurus, in 1994 Jean-Michel Dutuit and D. Heyler believed considered it a species of Sauravus.

See also

 Prehistoric amphibian
 List of prehistoric amphibians

References 

Fossil taxa described in 1906
Holospondyls